Altamont is a rock band from San Francisco, California. It was formed in 1994 as a side project by Dale Crover, drummer of the Melvins, along with Joey Osbourne and Dan Southwick of Acid King. The band is named after the infamous Altamont Free Concert of 1969.

Band members 
Dale Crover – guitar, vocals
Joey Osbourne – drums, vocals
Dan Southwick – bass

Discography

Studio albums

Compilation appearances 
 In the Groove CD (1999, The Music Cartel)
 Right in the Nuts: A Tribute to Aerosmith CD (2000, Small Stone Records)

Rock music groups from California